Bryce Cason Elder (born May 19, 1999) is an American professional baseball pitcher for the Atlanta Braves of Major League Baseball (MLB). Elder played college baseball at the University of Texas at Austin, and was drafted by the Braves in the fifth round of the 2020 MLB draft. He made his MLB debut in 2022.

Amateur career
Elder began playing baseball as a child, but stopped to focus on golf by his fifth grade year, to free up his weekends from travel team baseball activities. As a freshman at Decatur High School in Decatur, Texas, Elder considered returning to baseball, but the coach at the time would not permit Elder to play two spring season sports. A new baseball coach, hired before Elder's sophomore season, agreed to Elder's request to play baseball and golf. Elder also played basketball. After graduating from high school, Elder played college baseball at the University of Texas at Austin. In 2019, he played collegiate summer baseball with the Wareham Gatemen of the Cape Cod Baseball League.

Professional career
Elder was drafted by the Atlanta Braves in the fifth round of the 2020 Major League Baseball draft, and signed with the team for $850,000.

Elder made his professional debut in 2021 with the Rome Braves and was promoted to the Double-A Mississippi Braves and the Triple-A Gwinnett Stripers during the season. On July 10, 2021, Elder threw a combined no-hitter with Daysbel Hernandez. Over 25 starts between the three teams, Elder went 11–5 with a 2.75 ERA and 155 strikeouts over  innings.

On April 12, 2022, Elder was selected to the 40-man roster and promoted to the major leagues for the first time to make a spot start. He faced the Washington Nationals that night, pitching  innings, and earned a win. He was optioned to the Gwinnett Stripers on May 1. He was recalled on August 13 to face the Miami Marlins in another spot start the next day. On September 26, Elder threw a complete game shutout against the Washington Nationals, becoming the first Braves' rookie pitcher to do so since Paul Marak during the 1990 season.

In 2023, after impressive spring training performances by Jared Shuster and Dylan Dodd, Elder was optioned to Triple-A Gwinnett to begin the regular season.

Pitching style
Elder throws five pitches: a sinker, four-seam fastball, slider, changeup and curveball.

References

External links

1999 births
Living people
People from Decatur, Texas
Baseball players from Texas
Major League Baseball pitchers
Atlanta Braves players
Texas Longhorns baseball players
Wareham Gatemen players
Rome Braves players
Mississippi Braves players
Gwinnett Stripers players